Enbridge Centre is a 28-storey office tower in Edmonton, Alberta. The facade of the building uses the bricks from the historic Kelly Ramsey Building, which previously occupied the site.  It is located on 101 St. NW, and is connected to the Pedway network.

References

External links 

 Enbridge Centre Official Website

Buildings and structures in Edmonton
Office buildings completed in 2016
Enbridge